Henry O'Neill (Dromore, 3 January 1843Newry, 9 October 1915) was an Irish Catholic Priest who served as Bishop of Dromore from 1901 to 1915.

O'Neill was educated at St Colman's College, Newry and St Patrick's College, Maynooth. He was ordained priest in 1867. He was head teacher of his old school from 1869 to 1886; and parish priest at Clonallan from 1886 to 1901. He was ordained  Bishop of Dromore in 1901, a post he held until his death.

References

1843 births
1915 deaths
19th-century Roman Catholic bishops in Ireland
Roman Catholic bishops of Dromore
Alumni of St Patrick's College, Maynooth
People educated at St Colman's College, Newry